Geumseong Beom clan is one of the Korean clans. Their Bon-gwan is in Naju, South Jeolla Province. According to the research held in 2000, the number of Geumseong Beom clan’s member was 3316. Their founder was  who was from Langya Commandery, China.  entered Goryeo as a fatherly master of Princess Jeguk who had an marriage to an ordinary person planned by Chungnyeol of Goryeo in 1274.  worked as ministry of rites (禮部, Lǐbu) in Yuan dynasty. Beom Yu su made achievements as a commander during suppression of Jurchen people in 1334. Beom Yu su was awarded Gongsin and became Prince of Geumseong. Then, Beom Yu su officially started Geumseong Beom clan and made Geumseong, Geumseong Beom clan’s Bon-gwan.

See also 
 Korean clan names of foreign origin

References

External links 
 

 
Beom clans
Korean clan names of Chinese origin